Ok Kwan-bin (hangul:옥관빈, hanja:玉觀彬, ? - August 1, 1933) was a Korean Resistance activist and politician, Businessman. member of Shinminhoi(신민회;新民會) and Provisional Government of Koreas(대한민국 임시정부).

See also
Politics of South Korea

References

Year of birth missing
1933 deaths
Assassinated Korean people
Assassinated Korean politicians
Korean independence activists
Korean politicians
Korean revolutionaries
People murdered in Korea